Bob Dobelstein (October 27, 1922 – November 13, 2009) was an American football guard. He played for the New York Giants from 1946 to 1948 and for the Los Angeles Dons in 1949.

Death 
Dobelstein died on November 13, 2009, in Lake City, Florida, aged 87.

References

1922 births
2009 deaths
American football guards
Los Angeles Dons players
New York Giants players
Tennessee Volunteers football players
Sportspeople from Bridgeport, Connecticut
Players of American football from Connecticut
Central High School (Connecticut) alumni